Kim Sun-young (born April 17, 1980) is a South Korean actress and singer best known for her roles in the Korean films The Chaser, Love Lesson, Cutie, and Female War: A Nasty Deal.

References

External links
 
 
 
 

1980 births
Living people
South Korean film actresses
South Korean television actresses